Bheeman is a 1982 Indian Malayalam film, directed by Hassan. The film stars Kaviyoor Ponnamma, Sathaar, Balan K. Nair and Bheeman Raghu in the lead roles. The film has musical score by A. T. Ummer.

Cast
Bheeman Raghu
Kaviyoor Ponnamma
Sathaar
Balan K. Nair
Kuthiravattam Pappu
Ranipadmini
Swapna

Soundtrack
The music was composed by A. T. Ummer and the lyrics were written by K. G. Menon and Ramachandran.

References

External links
 

1982 films
1980s Malayalam-language films